USS LST-755 was a  in the United States Navy during World War II. She was transferred to the Republic of China Navy as ROCS Chung Hai (LST-201).

Construction and commissioning 
LST-755 was laid down on 20 May 1944 at American Bridge Company, Ambridge, Pennsylvania. Launched on 11 July 1944 and commissioned on 3 August 1944.

Service in the United States Navy 
During World War II, LST-755 was assigned to the Asiatic-Pacific theater. She then participated in the Lingayen Gulf landings from 13 to 18 January 1945. Then she was sent to the Philippines to participate in the Mindanao Island landings from 17 to 23 April 1945. She was assigned to occupation and China from 2 to 8 September 1945 to 29 May 1946.

She was decommissioned on 29 May 1946 and struck from the Naval Register, 12 March 1948.

Service in the Republic of China Navy 
She was acquired and commissioned into the Republic of China Navy on 29 May 1946 and renamed Chung Hai (LST-201).

The 79th Congress of the United States passed the China Aid Naval Act No. 512 on July 16, 1946, and was approved by President Truman, allowing the President to directly donate up to 271 warships to the Republic of China. The first batch of landing ships accepted by the bill was handed over at Qingdao Wharf.

This ship participated in the restoration of the sovereignty of the South China Sea Islands by the Republic of China. In 1939, the Japanese army seized control of the Dongsha, Xisha, and Nansha Islands from the French. After World War II, the Japanese troops occupying the Xisha and Nansha Islands surrendered to the national army. The ship departed from Shanghai in March 1948, via Kaohsiung, Guangzhou, and Yulin Port, and first sent Major Peng Yunsheng, director of the Nansha Islands Management Office, and his subordinates to Taiping Island, becoming the first commander of the Republic of China Navy on Taiping Island. Then send Captain Zhang Junran, director of the Paracel Islands Management Office, and his subordinates to Yongxing Island. The ship delivered supplies to Dongsha in early 1947 and between 1949 and 1951.

During the second civil war between the Kuomintang and the Chinese Communist Party (CCP), the ship participated in the Zhoushan Islands encirclement and suppression campaign and the Tashan campaign in the Jinzhou Relief Campaign in the Liaoxi Campaign in 1948. After the Liaoxi Warring States Army’s westward army was defeated by Lin Biao, the ship covered the Yingkou 52nd Army’s retreat.

During the Battle of Wanshan Islands, the ship was hit by a 28-ton gunboat Jiefang on May 25, 1950. The ship and destroyer escort Taihe fired back and killed the deputy of the People's Liberation Army Navy (PLAN) fleet. Captain Lin Wenhui, Lin Wenhui was pursued by the Central South Military Region as Navy Battle Heroes. There were 16 casualties among the 19 crew members of the Jiefang.

Before the battle of Yijiangshan Island in January 1955, the China Shipping Ship sent Colonel Wang Shengming who was in charge of the battle from Keelung to Yijiangshan. When it stopped on Dachen Island halfway, it was hit by two bombs from MiG-15 fighter jets on the 10th. Both bombs directly penetrated the main deck and fell into the coal pile carried in the tank without exploding.

On August 4, 1958, 9 torpedo boats from the First Brigade of the Sixth Torpedo Division of the PLAN entered the front line of Xiamen. At 18:30 in the 824 naval battle, the People's Liberation Army first bombarded Liuluo Bay with coastal artillery. The ship being unloaded was hit by two 130mm shells and then turned around and retreated. Ships such as Taisheng also withdrew from the range of the shore artillery and wandered into the open sea. At 19:10, six torpedo boats of the PLAN launched an attack. When they approached the 15th chain (300 meters), the National Army discovered that it was the Communists and opened fire, and at the same time evaded it urgently. At 20:25, the 105, 178, and 180 boats of the Second Squadron of the PLAN attacked the ship, and the 180 and 105 boats launched four torpedoes at the Chung Hai. In the big hole in the square, the motor and radar failed. 8 people were killed and 12 injured on the spot. However, the Chinese ship still turned right and fired at full force. At a distance of 500 meters, the 184 and 175 boats of the First Squadron of the PLAN fired a salvo, and the 103 boats were launched separately. The Taisheng was shot and exploded in which she sank five minutes later. During the retreat of the PLAN torpedo boat, the No. 175 boat released smoke in the moonlight, but exposed its whereabouts. It was fired by the artillery fire of the national patrol ships Xiangjiang (PC-103), Mei Song (LSM-347) and Chung Hai. It sank after hitting 11 bullets. Three people on a torpedo boat sunk by the Communists were captured and sent to Taiwan. The history of the Chinese military warfare claimed that the Chinese navy ship sunk 2 enemy boats and seriously injured 1 ship in this campaign. The national army sank 8 enemy torpedo boats. However, Taiwan’s Central News Agency and other reports have adopted the statement that the ship sank one enemy ship. The People's Liberation Army admitted that the torpedo boat 175 was sunk.

After the 824 naval battle, the ship was towed to the U.S. naval base Subic Bay, Philippines for repairs. The bow of the ship was replaced with a new one. The total repair cost was US$500,000. The China-Singapore Plan of the Republic of China Navy replaced all Chung Hai-class with new German engines and expanded the bridges. The ship sailed for 75,126 hours and 556,728 nautical miles (1,031,060 kilometers) during her service in the ROC Navy. She was decommissioned on 1 February 2010.

The 2018 Cultural Assets Conference proposed to transform the Chung Hai into a museum ship, which has a precedent in other countries. The current status is designated as Important Antiquities and cannot be dismantled and sold.

On 19 May 2020, the ship was sold for scrap despite backlash from military historians and enthusiasts due to her poor conditions. There was discussion by the Navy to consider using the retired ship for SINKEX. The Kinmen County Government planned to move her to Kinmen Island to be preserved there but plans fell through due to the lack of funding. On 21 May, the shipyard's plan to scrap the ship was postponed in fear of backlash. She is currently sitting in Qijin, Kaohsiung awaiting restoration.

On 21 March 2021, the latest news regarding the ship is expected to settle in the Lin Mo Niang Memorial Park in Anping District, Tainan City. It will be connected with the nearby sailing ship Tainan Chenggong of Ming Zheng period and ROCS Te Yang (DDG-925).

Awards 
LST-755 have earned the following awards:

 China Service Medal (extended) 
American Campaign Medal 
Asiatic-Pacific Campaign Medal (2 battle stars)
World War II Victory Medal
Navy Occupation Service Medal (with Asia clasp) 
Philippine Presidential Unit Citation
Philippine Liberation Medal (2 battle stars)

Gallery

Citations

Sources 
 
 
 
 

LST-542-class tank landing ships
Ships built in Ambridge, Pennsylvania
World War II amphibious warfare vessels of the United States
LST-542-class tank landing ships of the Republic of China Navy
1944 ships